Hotline is the third album by the Christian rock band White Heart and the band's first with Gordon Kennedy on guitars and the last with both lead vocalist Scott Douglas and on the Home Sweet Home  label. The first radio single "Jerusalem" features lead vocals from both Douglas and lead guitarist Kennedy and became a top five hit on Christian radio and was co-written with the Christian rock duo DeGarmo and Key. Hotline peaked at number 13 on the Billboard Top Inspirational Albums chart.

Track listing
 "Hotline" (Billy Smiley, Scott Douglas) – 4:14 
 "Gotta Be A Believer" (Smiley, Mark Gersmehl) – 4:21
 "Jerusalem" (Smiley, Gersmehl, Eddie DeGarmo, Dana Key) – 3:50 	
 "Turn The Page" (Smiley, Gersmehl) – 4:55
 "She's A Runaway" (Smiley, Gersmehl) – 3:40
 "Heroes" (Smiley, Gersmehl) – 4:36
 "In His Name" (Gersmehl) – 4:14
 "The Victory" (Smiley, Gersmehl, Gordon Kennedy, Larry Stewart) – 4:22 
 "Walls" (Gersmehl) – 2:35
 "Keep Fighting The Fight" (Smiley, Gersmehl) – 3:08

Personnel 
White Heart
 Scott Douglas – lead vocals (1-3, 5-9)
 Mark Gersmehl – keyboards, backing vocals (1, 2, 4, 6, 9), synthesizers (2, 3, 8), lead vocals (2, 4-6, 10)
 Billy Smiley – keyboards, guitars, backing vocals (1, 2, 4, 6, 7, 9, 10)
 Gordon Kennedy – lead guitars, guitar solo (1, 5, 8, 9), backing vocals (1), lead vocals (3, 8), sitar (4)
 Gary Lunn – bass 
 David Huff – drums, percussion (3, 5)

Additional Musicians
 Steve Green – backing vocals (2, 4)
 David Pierce – backing vocals (6)
 Stan Armor – backing vocals (6, 9)

Production 
 Producers – Mark Gersmehl and Billy Smiley
 Executive Producer – Chris Christian
 Tracks 1-8 & 10 recorded by Brent King
 Track 9 recorded by Bob Graves
 Second Engineers – Sam Bailey (Tracks  1-8 & 10), David Pierce (Tracks 1-8 & 10) and Clark Schleicher (Track 9).
 Recorded at The Bennett House (Franklin, TN).
 Mixed by Brent King
 Mixed and Overdubbed at Gold Mine Studio (Nashville, TN).
 Mastered by Hank Williams at MasterMix (Nashville, TN).
 Art Direction and Design – Bill Brunt
 Photography – Mark Tucker, Ron Keith and Scott Bonner.

Charts

Radio singles

References

1985 albums
White Heart albums